Pierre Devambez (19 November 1902 in Paris – 14 January 1980 in Paris) was a 20th-century French Hellenist, archaeologist and historian of Greek art.

Biography 
The son of André Devambez, Pierre Devambez joined the École normale supérieure in 1922 and passed the agrégation es lettres in 1926. A member of the French School at Athens (1928–1933) and of the Institut Français d'Archéologie Orientale, he sojourned in Istanbul from 1933 to 1937 and wrote there the Catalogue des Grands Bronzes.

From 1929 to 1933 he directed the excavations at Thasos, as again in 1953–1954, and the excavations of the Sinuri sanctuary in Caria (1935–1938). He also participated in the work at Xanthos (1950) and, from 1961 to 1963, at Laodicea on the Lycus.

Curator and chief curator of the Department of Greek and Roman antiquities at the Louvre from 1937, he was also in charge of Greek ceramics course at the École du Louvre. Providing classes at the École Normale Supérieure (1954), he moved the classical archeology seminar in the halls of the Louvre.

A director of a seminary in Archaic and Classical Greek religion at the École pratique des hautes études (1961–1967), he was elected a member of the Académie des inscriptions et belles-lettres in 1970 and would preside the international commission of the Corpus vasorum antiquorum.

Selected publications 
1932: Un quartier romain à Thasos (fouilles de 1925 à 1931)
1937: Grands Bronzes du musée de Stamboul
1939: La Sculpture grecque
1942: Sculptures thasiennes, in Bulletin de correspondance hellénique
1944: Le style grec, Larousse
1955: L'Art au siècle de Périclès
1959: Le Sanctuaire de Sinuri près de Mylasa, with E. Haspels
1960: Sculptures grecques
1962: Bas-relief de Téos
1962: La Peinture grecque
1966: Dictionnaire de la civilisation grecque, with R. Flacelière, P. M. Schuhl, R. Martin
1978: Grèce, Hachette
1983: Le monde non-chrétien, Gallimard.

Bibliography 
1980: Pierre Demargne, Éloge funèbre de M. Pierre Devambez, in Comptes rendus de l'Académie des inscriptions et belles-lettres
1980: F. Villard, Pierre Devambez, in Revue archéologique
1981: J. Pouilloux, Notice sur la vie et les travaux de Pierre Devambez, in Comptes rendus de l'Académie des inscriptions et belles-lettres
1981: B. Holtzmann, Pierre Devambez 1902-1980, in Encyclopaedia Universalis
2007: Eve Gran-Aymerich, Les chercheurs de passé, Éditions du CNRS, 2007,  (p. 750–751)

External links 
 Pierre Devambez on data.bnf.fr
 Pierre Devambez on Encyclopedia Universalis
 Notice sur la vie et les travaux de Pierre Devambez on Persée

École Normale Supérieure alumni
Academic staff of the École Normale Supérieure
French archaeologists
French hellenists
French art historians
Academic staff of the École pratique des hautes études
Members of the Institute for Catalan Studies
Members of the Académie des Inscriptions et Belles-Lettres
Members of the French School at Athens
1902 births
Writers from Paris
1980 deaths
20th-century archaeologists